The Connolly Youth Movement (often abbreviated as CYM ) is an all-Ireland Marxist–Leninist youth organisation. It is a member of the World Federation of Democratic Youth. It takes its name from the revolutionary socialist James Connolly.

History and current status

The CYM was founded in 1963 by young republicans who were influenced by the Communist Party during the Dublin Housing Action struggle. In 1970 with the merger of the Irish Workers' Party and Communist Party of Northern Ireland, to form the Communist Party of Ireland, the Northern Ireland Young Communist League joined the CYM, with Madge Davison as its general secretary. The CYM disbanded in 1991 due to a reduction in membership following the dissolution of the Soviet Union and eastern and central European bloc and the resulting political crisis in the World Communist Movement. However, following the resurgence of the left and anti-capitalist movement in Ireland, the CYM re-formed in 2002, grouped mainly around young members of the Dublin Branch of the CPI and student activists in NUI (National University of Ireland), Galway. The Connolly Youth Movement has relations with a number of young communist organisations around the world. The Connolly Youth Movement attends the :Meeting of European Communist Youth Organizations (MECYO).

The CYM supported the programme of the Communist Party of Ireland until a vote of the membership rescinded it at an Extraordinary Ard Fheis on 9 January 2021. In February 2021, the Communist Party of Ireland issued a statement stating that several dual (CPI-CYM) members had been expelled for alleged breaches of discipline and factional behaviour within the CPI prior to the CYM's decision to drop its support for the programme of the CPI.

Activities
In 2017, members of the Cork branch of the Connolly Youth Movement occupied and re-purposed three derelict buildings near UCC as part of an initiative to highlight rising levels of homelessness.  In 2018, two of these buildings were repossessed by the Garda Emergency Response Unit acting in conjunction with a contractor for the O'Dwyer Asset Management Company that owned the vacant properties. The first occupation, still ongoing as of 2021, is referred to as Connolly Barracks by the organisation.

The Connolly Youth Movement was involved in highly publicised instances of direct action in 2018 and 2019 when members of the movement disrupted Fine Gael public meetings in Cork in protest of government policy in relation to homelessness and wealth inequality. One such action was criticised by Taoiseach Leo Varadkar, who stated "I think no matter what political party you come from or what your political views, we should all be committed to democracy and freedom of speech and trying to shout other people down and trying to shut down their meetings is profoundly anti-democratic". The organisation responded that it had a right to challenge and question the government on policy issues. In a March 2020 interview, then CYM General Secretary Alex Homits stated "Socialism will not and cannot be delivered through the ballot box and the CYM and its membership will not lie about this or endorse those who do."

In March 2023, members of the Connolly Youth Movement interrupted an event in Dublin City University where Bertie Ahern was receiving an honorary doctorate, describing him as an "architect of the financial crisis" before being removed from the venue.

Policies and Ideology 

The CYM is constitutionally a socialist-republican and Marxist-Leninist organisation. In July 2022 it published a new programme, Cause of Youth, Cause of Ireland. It also released a ten point programme expressing a commitment to Irish unity, civil rights, the revival of Irish culture, free education, action on climate change, promotion of the Irish language, free healthcare on an all-Ireland basis, a public housing programme, international solidarity, and "a comprehensive system of worker's rights".

In 2020 the CYM's then General Secretary Alex Homits stated that "poverty and trafficking are the leading creators of sex workers." The CYM have offered solidarity to those engaged in sex work, and support for decriminalisation of the purchase of sex.

Publications
The CYM irregularly publishes a print magazine titled Forward, with online articles published under the same title.

Affiliations
 World Federation of Democratic Youth, a left-wing anti imperialist youth organization

Prominent past members of CYM
 Madge Davison
 Declan Bree – served as Chairperson of the CYM
 Brendan O'Carroll

References

External links
 
 Archive of Forward Issues

All-Ireland political parties
Communist parties in Ireland
Communist parties in Northern Ireland
All-Ireland organisations
Irish republican organisations